The 2013–14 season was Petrolul Ploiești's 84th season in the Romanian football league system, and their third consecutive season in the Liga I.

They finished third in the 2012–13 Liga I, as well as winning the Cupa României for the third time in their history. Petrolul competed in UEFA Europa League, following an 18-year absence in European competitions. After defeating Víkingur Gøta and Vitesse Arnhem, they were eliminated in the play-off round by Swansea City. During the winter transfer window, the team brought Adrian Mutu, a former Romanian international, which attracted media attention. In January 2014, German automobile manufacturer Opel became Petrolul's shirt sponsor. In April, Petrolul had the chance to qualify for their second consecutive Cupa României final, but lost the second leg of the semi-final against rivals Astra Giurgiu (2–1), after a 0–0 result at home.  The fans blamed Petrolul's administration for selling two of their best players (Hamza Younés and Damien Boudjemaa), and bringing Adrian Mutu and Ianis Zicu, who did not live up to expectations. Some also considered that the new manager, Răzvan Lucescu, wasn't a suitable replacer for Cosmin Contra, who left the club for Getafe in March. Petrolul came third in the Liga I for a second successive season, thus again participating in the UEFA Europa League second qualifying round.

Players

First team squad
At the end of the season.

Out on loan

Reserve players with first team appearances
Petrolul Ploiești's reserve team includes players from the club's academy.

Transfers

In

Out

Competitions

Supercupa României

Liga I

League table

Results summary

Results by opponent

Cupa României

Semi-finals

Last updated: 17 April 2014
Source: FRF

UEFA Europa League

Qualifying rounds

Second qualifying round

Third qualifying round

Play-off round

Pre-season and friendlies

Last updated: 15 February 2014

See also

2013–14 Cupa României
2013–14 Liga I
2013–14 UEFA Europa League

Notes and references

FC Petrolul Ploiești seasons
Petrolul Ploiesti season
Petrolul Ploiesti